Steere's sphenomorphus (Parvoscincus steerei)  is a species of skink found in the Philippines.

References

Parvoscincus
Reptiles described in 1908
Taxa named by Leonhard Stejneger